Evgheni Gorodețchi (born 24 September 1985) is a Moldovan former footballer who played as a midfielder.

Career
Born in Dnestrovsc, Gorodețchi started his career with Sheriff Tiraspol in the 2003–04 season. After only making one appearance for the team, he instead joined neighbouring FC Tiraspol, where he stayed for three seasons. In 2007, he moved back to Sheriff Tiraspol, before returning to FC Tiraspol in 2009. He later played for Iskra-Stal Rîbnița, Dinamo-Auto Tiraspol and Russian side Anapa.

References

1985 births
Living people
People from Slobozia District
Association football midfielders
Moldovan footballers
FC Sheriff Tiraspol players
FC Tiraspol players
FC Iskra-Stal players
FC Dinamo-Auto Tiraspol players
Moldovan Super Liga players
FC Spartak-UGP Anapa players
Moldovan expatriate footballers
Moldovan expatriate sportspeople in Russia
Expatriate footballers in Russia